William Kelly (September 22, 1786August 24, 1834) was an American politician, who served as the Democratic-Republican U.S. senator from the state of Alabama from December 12, 1822, to 1825. He was originally elected to fill the remainder of John Williams Walker's term, who resigned.

Early life
Kelly on September 22, 1786, was born in South Carolina.

Political life
After serving as a U.S. Senator until 1825, he became a member of the Alabama House of Representatives.

Late life
On August 24, 1834, Kelly died in New Orleans, Orleans Parish, Louisiana. Burial location unknown.

External links

References

1786 births
1834 deaths
Members of the Alabama House of Representatives
Alabama Democratic-Republicans
Democratic-Republican Party United States senators from Alabama
19th-century American politicians